Carnosine (beta-alanyl-L-histidine) is a dipeptide molecule, made up of the amino acids beta-alanine and histidine. It is highly concentrated in muscle and brain tissues. Carnosine was discovered by Russian chemist Vladimir Gulevich.

Carnosine is naturally produced by the body in the liver from beta-alanine and histidine. Like carnitine, carnosine is composed of the root word carn, meaning "flesh", alluding to its prevalence in meat. There are no plant-based sources of carnosine. Carnosine is readily available as a synthetic nutritional supplement.

Biosynthesis
Carnosine is synthesized within the body from beta-alanine and histidine. Beta-alanine is a product of pyrimidine catabolism and histidine is an essential amino acid. Since beta-alanine is the limiting substrate, supplementing just beta-alanine effectively increases the intramuscular concentration of carnosine.

Physiological effects

pH buffer 
Carnosine has a pKa value of 6.83, making it a good buffer for the pH range of animal muscles. Since beta-alanine is not incorporated into proteins, carnosine can be stored at relatively high concentrations (millimolar). Occurring at 17–25 mmol/kg (dry muscle), carnosine (β-alanyl-L-histidine) is an important intramuscular buffer, constituting 10-20% of the total buffering capacity in type I and II muscle fibres.

Anti-oxidant 
Carnosine has been proven to scavenge reactive oxygen species (ROS) as well as alpha-beta unsaturated aldehydes formed from peroxidation of cell membrane fatty acids during oxidative stress. It also buffers pH in muscle cells, and acts as a neurotransmitter in the brain. It is also a zwitterion, a neutral molecule with a positive and negative end.

Antiglycating
Carnosine acts as an antiglycating agent, reducing the rate of formation of advanced glycation end-products (substances that can be a factor in the development or worsening of many degenerative diseases, such as diabetes, atherosclerosis, chronic kidney failure, and Alzheimer's disease), and ultimately reducing development of atherosclerotic plaque build-up.

Geroprotective 
Carnosine is considered as a geroprotector. Carnosine can increase the Hayflick limit in human fibroblasts, as well as appearing to reduce the telomere shortening rate. Carnosine may also slow aging through its anti-glycating properties (chronic glycolysis is speculated to accelerate aging).

Other 
Carnosine can chelate divalent metal ions.

Carnosine administration has been shown to have cardioprotective properties, protecting against ischaemia-reperfusion injury, and doxorubicin-induced cardiomyopathy.

Carnosine demonstrated neuroprotective effects in multiple animal studies.

Research has demonstrated a positive association between muscle tissue carnosine concentration and exercise performance. β-Alanine supplementation is thought to increase exercise performance by promoting carnosine production in muscle. Exercise has conversely been found to increase muscle carnosine concentrations, and muscle carnosine content is higher in athletes engaging in anaerobic exercise.

Carnosine appears to protect in experimental ischemic stroke by influencing a number of mechanisms that are activated during stroke. It is a potent pH buffer and has anti-matrix metalloproteinase activity, antioxidant and antiexcitotoxic properties and protects the blood brain barrier.

See also
 Acetylcarnosine, a similar molecule used to treat lens cataracts
 Anserine, another dipeptide antioxidant (found in birds)
 Carnosine synthase, an enzyme that helps carnosine production
 Carnosinemia, a disease of excess carnosine due to an enzyme defect/deficiency

References

Dipeptides
Anti-aging substances
Dietary supplements